The Core Humanitarian Standard Alliance, known as the CHS Alliance, is a network of non-governmental organizations working in humanitarian aid.

The focus of the CHS Alliance is the Core Humanitarian Standard on Quality and Accountability.

History and mandate 
The CHS Alliance was founded in June 2015 by the merger of HAP International and People In Aid.

It is a coalition of humanitarian and international development organizations that works to strengthen accountability in the sector.

Activities 
One of its core mandates of the CHS Alliance is to apply and promote the Core Humanitarian Standard on Quality and Accountability (CHS), which was developed HAP International, People In Aid, and (later) Groupe URD.

The CHS now forms part of the Sphere Handbook on minimum standards in humanitarian response.

The Humanitarian Quality Assurance Initiative was created in 2015 to audit compliance with the CHS.

The CHS Alliance published the Protection from Sexual Exploitation Index and handbook and works with Foreign, Commonwealth and Development Office to create whistleblowing guidance.

In 2021 the CHS Alliance was critical of the use of non disclosure agreements in the aid sector.

Criticisms 
Sandrine Tiller of Médecins Sans Frontières described the standards that the CHS Alliance promote as too simplistic and generic. That criticism was rejected by Simon Eccleshall of the International Federation of Red Cross and Red Crescent Societies who said that the simplicity was intentional, considering the wide range of potential users of the standard.

Further reading
 German first-aid Alliance

References 

Humanitarian aid organizations in Europe
Charities based in Switzerland